The One Love Tennis Open was a tournament for professional female tennis players played on outdoor hardcourts. The event was classified as a $50,000 ITF Women's Circuit tournament, held in Atlanta, United States, only 2016.

Past finals

Singles

Doubles

External links 
 Official website 
 ITF search

One Love Tennis Open
Hard court tennis tournaments in the United States
Recurring sporting events established in 2016
Tennis tournaments in Georgia (U.S. state)
Women's tennis tournaments in the United States